Gilbert Marie N'gbo Aké (born 1956) is an Ivorian academic and politician.  He was named Prime Minister of Côte d'Ivoire by President Laurent Gbagbo after the latter claimed victory in the disputed 2010 presidential election.

Life and career
Professor Gilbert Marie N'gbo Aké successfully obtained a State PhD in economics in 1991 at the University of Toulouse, specialising in econometrics and regulatory economics. He was Dean of the Faculty of Economics and Management from 2001 to 2007. He was President of the Université de Cocody until 2011, and he was Chairman of the Scientific Committee for the celebration of the 50th anniversary of Côte d'Ivoire's independence. He was appointed as Prime Minister by Laurent Gbagbo on 7 December 2010, at the beginning of the 2010–11 Ivorian crisis.

Following Gbagbo's ouster, Aké's appointment was nullified by ordinance n°2011-007 of 14 April 2011. In May 2011 he was arrested and charged with threatening national security. In December 2012, he and seven other former ministers of Laurent Gbagbo's last government were released.

References

Government ministers of Ivory Coast
Heads of government of Ivory Coast
Living people
1956 births
University of Toulouse alumni
Academic staff of Université Félix Houphouët-Boigny
Ivorian Popular Front politicians
Heads of government who were later imprisoned